United States gubernatorial elections were held in 1914, in 31 states, concurrent with the House and Senate elections, on November 3, 1914 (except for Arkansas and Maine, where they were held on September 14, and Georgia, where they were held on October 7).

In Arizona, the governor was elected to a two-year term for the first time, having been elected to an inaugural three-year term at the first election in 1911. In Vermont, the gubernatorial election was held on the same day as federal elections for the first time, having previously been held in September. In Arkansas and Georgia, the gubernatorial election was held in September and October, respectively, for the last time, moving to the same day as federal elections from the 1916 elections.

Results

See also 
1914 United States elections
1914 United States Senate elections
1914 United States House of Representatives elections

References

Notes 

 
November 1914 events